Irina Bara and Ekaterine Gorgodze were the defending champions, but chose to participate with different partners. Bara played alongside Réka Luca Jani but lost in the quarterfinals to Andrea Gámiz  and Eva Vedder. Gorgodze played alongside Tímea Babos but lost in the first round to Amina Anshba and Darya Astakhova.

Ingrid Martins and Luisa Stefani won the title, defeating Quinn Gleason and Elixane Lechemia in the final, 7–5, 6–7(6–8), [10–6].

Seeds

Draw

Draw

References

External links
Main Draw

Montevideo Open - Doubles